Psychrobacter adeliensis is a Gram-negative bacterium of the genus Psychrobacter which was isolated from fast ice in the middle of the Geologie Archipelago in Adelie Land in the Antarctica.

References

External links
Type strain of Psychrobacter adeliensis at BacDive -  the Bacterial Diversity Metadatabase

Moraxellaceae
Bacteria described in 2005